Keyser High School is a comprehensive four-year public high school located in Keyser, West Virginia, in  Mineral County  that operates as part of the  Mineral County Schools District.

History

Piedmont High School was combined into Keyser High School in 1976.  In the late 1990s, Keyser High School moved from its former location on East Piedmont Street, which had served as Keyser High for over 100 years, to a new facility approximately three miles south.

In 2022 Keyser High was ranked #79 out of 116 West Virginia high schools by U.S. News. Keyser was also ranked #3 out of six high schools in the Cumberland, MD Metro Area.

Curriculum
Eligible students may take courses at the Mineral County Technical Center.

Notable alumni
Jonah Edward Kelley, Medal of Honor recipient
John Kruk, Major League Baseball player and ESPN commentator
Catherine Marshall, author

References

External links

Keyser High School Facebook

Keyser High School Twitter

Public high schools in West Virginia
High schools in Cumberland, MD-WV-PA
Schools in Mineral County, West Virginia